Sambrook's Brewery is a British brewery, based in Battersea, London

It started brewing in 2008. It was founded by Duncan Sambrook, who had been an accountant for Deloitte, with support from David Welsh, the former owner of the Ringwood Brewery.

The head brewer is Sean Knight, a native of Cape Town, South Africa.

As of November 2016, the brewery is producing 180 hectolitres per annum, and bottling is done in Broadstairs, Kent, in a facility also used by Ramsgate and Westerham breweries.

Since 2016 the brewery has brewed the Watneys brand of beers on behalf of Brands Reunited, the current owner of this former London beer brand.

In July 2019, it was announced that Sambrook's  would be moving to the former Young's brewery site in Wandsworth, and will have a tap room, visitors' center and brewery museum.

Beers
Wandle Ale
Junction Ale
Powerhouse Porter
Pumphouse Pale Ale
Lavender Hill
Powerhouse Porter
Russian Imperial Stout
Battersea IPA
Battersea Rye
Black IPA
London Pale Ale
Buffalo Badger
Brown Dog Riot

References

External links
Official website

Breweries in London
British companies established in 2008